Sahebabad may refer to:
 Sahebabad, Bardsir, Kerman Province
 Sahebabad, Jiroft, Kerman Province